Nicolas Eugène Géruzez (6 January 1799 – 29 May 1865), was a French critic.

He was born at Reims.  He was assistant professor at the Sorbonne, and in 1852 he became secretary to the faculty of literature. His works include a Histoire de l'éloquence politique et religieuse en France aux XIV', XV' et XVI' siècles (1837-1838); an Histoire de la littérature française depuis les origines jusqu’a la Revolution (1852), which he supplemented in 1859 by a volume bringing down the history to the close of the revolutionary period; and some miscellaneous works.

Géruzez died in Paris. A posthumous volume of Mélanges et pensées appeared in 1877.

His son, Victor Eugène Géruzez (known as "Crafty") was an equestrian illustrator.

References

1799 births
1865 deaths
Writers from Reims
Academic staff of the University of Paris
École Normale Supérieure alumni
19th-century French historians
French literary critics
French male non-fiction writers